South Park is an American animated television sitcom created by Trey Parker and Matt Stone for Comedy Central. The series came from a pair of animated shorts titled The Spirit of Christmas, and was originally developed for the Fox Broadcasting Company. Eventually, Fox refused to air the show, which was later picked up by Comedy Central. The first episode of South Park aired on Comedy Central on August 13, 1997. Intended for mature audiences, the show has become infamous for its crude language and dark, surreal humor that lampoons a wide range of topics. The story revolves around four boys—Stan Marsh, Kyle Broflovski, Eric Cartman, and Kenny McCormick—and their bizarre adventures in and around the eponymous Colorado town.

Episodes of South Park have been nominated for a variety of different awards, including three Annie Awards (with one win), two Critics' Choice Television Award (with no wins), 17 Emmy Awards (with five wins), 3 TCA Awards (with no wins), and received a Peabody Award. The first twenty-three seasons have been released on DVD and Blu-ray, in addition to several compilation DVDs.

On September 12, 2019, the show was renewed up to the 26th season.

On August 5, 2021, Comedy Central announced that Parker and Stone signed a $900 million deal for extending the series to 30 seasons through 2027. The deal also included 14 new original movies for Paramount+, with two new movies being released yearly starting in 2021. Parker and Stone would later state that the projects would not be feature films, and that it was ViacomCBS who decided to advertise them as movies. Subsequent advertising and branding in press releases from Paramount+ frequently uses the term "exclusive event" instead, indicating that these are more properly classified as television specials.



Series overview

Episodes

Season 1 (1997–98)

Season 2 (1998–99)

Season 3 (1999–2000)

Season 4 (2000)

Season 5 (2001)

Season 6 (2002)

Season 7 (2003)

Season 8 (2004)

Season 9 (2005)

Season 10 (2006)

Season 11 (2007)

Season 12 (2008)

Season 13 (2009)

Season 14 (2010)

Season 15 (2011)

Season 16 (2012)

Season 17 (2013)

Season 18 (2014)

Season 19 (2015)

Season 20 (2016)

Season 21 (2017)

Season 22 (2018)

Season 23 (2019)

Season 24 (2020–21)

Specials (2021)

Season 25 (2022)

Specials (2022)

Season 26 (2023)

Home media

Notes

References

External links

 
Episodes
South Park
Lists of American sitcom episodes